Piotr Bania (born February 6, 1973) is a Polish football player.

Career
He had also played for Kabla Kraków, Hutnik Kraków, Proszowianka Proszowice and Sandecja Nowy Sącz Družstevník Plavnica. Halfway through the 2003/04 football season, Bania took up archery and became champion of archery's second league.

References

1973 births
Polish footballers
Polish male archers
Living people
MKS Cracovia (football) players
Hutnik Nowa Huta players
Proszowianka Proszowice players
Sandecja Nowy Sącz players
Ekstraklasa players
FK Družstevník Plavnica players
3. Liga (Slovakia) players
4. Liga (Slovakia) players
Expatriate footballers in Slovakia
Polish expatriate sportspeople in Slovakia
Footballers from Kraków
Wawel Kraków players
Association football forwards